Gabriela Kouassi (born 18 November 1979) is a retired French-Ivorian heptathlete who saw success on continental level.

Representing France, she finished 18th at the 1998 World Junior Championships and 17th at the 2001 European U23 Championships. She later changed her allegiance to Ivory Coast.

She won the gold medal at the 2009 Jeux de la Francophonie, the silver medal at the 2011 All-Africa Games and another silver medal at the 2012 African Championships.

Her personal best score was 5766 points, achieved in April 2012 in Bambous, Mauritius. This is the Ivorian record. She also holds Ivorian records for pentathlon (indoors), shot put indoors and javelin throw.

References

1979 births
Living people
French sportspeople of Ivorian descent
French heptathletes
Ivorian heptathletes
African Games medalists in athletics (track and field)
African Games silver medalists for Ivory Coast
Athletes (track and field) at the 2011 All-Africa Games